Jose Calingasan is a Filipino politician. He was a former member of the House of Representatives representing the 4th District of Batangas. He is also a co-founder of Lakas CMD. He also served as an Ambassador to Bangladesh during the administration of Fidel Ramos.

Notes

People from Batangas
Filipino diplomats
Living people
Lakas–CMD (1991) politicians
Members of the House of Representatives of the Philippines from Batangas
Ambassadors of the Philippines to Bangladesh
Year of birth missing (living people)